The Kansas Department of Corrections is a cabinet-level agency of Kansas that operates the state's correctional facilities, both juvenile and adult; the state's parole system; and the state's Prisoner Review Board. It is headquartered in Topeka.

Correctional facilities

The Kansas Department of Corrections operates eight adult correctional facility sites, three satellite correctional facility sites and one juvenile correctional facility.
 El Dorado Correctional Facility (inmate capacity 1955)
 Ellsworth Correctional Facility (inmate capacity 913)
 Hutchinson Correctional Facility (inmate capacity 1862)
 Kansas Juvenile Correctional Complex (offender capacity 270)
 Lansing Correctional Facility (inmate capacity 1906)
 Larned Correctional Mental Health Facility (inmate capacity 626)
 Norton Correctional Facility (inmate capacity 975)
Topeka Correctional Facility (inmate capacity 903) – Women's facility
 Winfield Correctional Facility (inmate capacity 554)
 Wichita Work Release Facility (inmate capacity 250)

Community & Field Services
The community and field services division has two units - parole and community corrections.

Victim Services
The Office of Victim Services (OVS) provides confidential support and information to victims, survivors, and witnesses if the offender in the crime was sentenced to incarceration in the Kansas Department of Corrections.  Services provided include victim notification, safety planning, victim restitution, parole comment session advocacy, Victim/Offender Dialogue (VOD) program, facility tours, and apology letters.

Kansas Correctional Industries
The department uses inmate labor to produce products such as office furniture, park equipment, and clothing for state government. Workers are paid very small sums allowing KCI to undercut conventional businesses.

Staffing
The department has suffered staff shortages for many years. In 2017, press reports indicated a turnover among KDOC officers of 46% per year. A 10% pay raise increased the hourly wage for uniformed employees to $14.66 but did not include non-uniformed staff. The El Dorado facility was authorized a staff of 682, but about a quarter of the positions were vacant.

By 2019, the department was forced to contract with CoreCivic to move six hundred prisoners to Arizona due to staff shortages. At that time, the department reported an overall inmate population of 10,002 indicating about ten percent of the population was to be moved out of state.

See also

 List of law enforcement agencies in Kansas
 List of United States state correction agencies
 List of U.S. state prisons
 Prison

References

External links
Official website
Kansas Department of Corrections publications available at the Kansas Government Information (KGI) Online Library

State law enforcement agencies of Kansas
State corrections departments of the United States
 
Kansas